Tuzo may refer to:

People
 Harry Tuzo (1917–1998), British army officer
 John Tuzo Wilson (1908–1993), Canadian geophysicist and geologist

Places
 Mount Tuzo, Canada
 Tuzo Wilson Seamounts

Other
 Alto Rendimiento Tuzo, Mexican football club
 Tuzo chicken, a true bantam chicken breed